Natalia Sokolovskaya (Russian: Наталья Соколовская; born in June, 1989) is a Russian pianist and composer.

Biography
Sokolovskaya, born in Russia, began playing the piano and composing at the age of 3. She studied at the Moscow Conservatory from 2007-13.

Since her first solo recital in 2003, she has given many recitals in the UK, Australia, Germany, Austria, France, Italy, Spain, Czech Republic, Taiwan, Russia and Malta. She has also performed with, among others, CBCO, Sinfónica del Vallès, St-Petersburg State Symphony Orchestra "Classica", Philharmonic Orchestra of Kharkov, Yaroslavl, Astrakhan etc.

She released a 2017 album of Piano Works by Leoš Janáček (OnClassical OC18060C). She also appeared on Guy Bacos's 2017 albums Christmas Variations and Mourning, Elegy, and Others.

She has written her own Paganini Variations.

Competitions 
2016 - First German Piano Open Competition, Germany - special prize
2015 - International Piano Competition "Cidade de Ferrol", Spain - third prize
2015 - MozARTe International Piano Competition, Germany - first prize
2015 - Nuova Coppa Piano Competition, Osimo, Italy - second prize
2014 - María Herrero Piano Competition, Spain - first prize
2013 - Ricard Viñes International Piano Competition, Spain - first prize
2008 - Camillo Togni Competition, Italy - first prize

Sokolovskaya has won numerous prizes including at the Dudley Yamaha International Piano Competition (UK 2014), Wells (UK) etc. She won a special prize at the First German Piano Open Competition (2016).

References

External links
Website
Piano recording by the artist

1989 births
Living people
People from Astrakhan
Russian musicians
21st-century classical pianists
Russian women pianists
Russian classical pianists
Women classical pianists
21st-century women pianists